The green figbird or Timor figbird (Sphecotheres viridis) is a species of bird in the family Oriolidae. It is endemic to forest, woodland, mangrove, and scrub on the Indonesian islands of Roti and Timor. It is moderately common, so is considered to be of least concern by BirdLife International and the IUCN.

Taxonomy and systematics
Formerly, some authorities have classified the green figbird in the genus Oriolus. It has sometimes included the two other figbirds as subspecies, in which case the combined species simply was known as "figbird", but today, all major authorities consider them as separate species.

Description
It resembles the more widespread Australian figbird, but is smaller, and except for the paler crissum (around the cloaca), the male is entirely yellow-olive below (including the throat).

References

External links

Timor figbird - images on the Animal Diversity Web
Timor figbird - videos and photos in the Internet Bird Collection

green figbird
Birds of Timor
green figbird
Taxa named by Louis Jean Pierre Vieillot